The Lampasas River is a river in the U.S. state of Texas. The river originates near the city of Hamilton and travels southeast for 75 miles through central Texas to a man-made reservoir called Stillhouse Hollow Lake. The river flows about 100 miles southeast through Lampasas, Burnet, and Bell Counties. It continues for a short distance after the lake to converge with the Leon River to form the Little River (Texas) near Belton.

The Lampasas River is the northernmost and westernmost river in the natural range of the American alligator, which is still found there. In June 2015, two men were arrested for shooting and killing an alligator that they found on the river.

See also
List of rivers of Texas
Lampasas, Texas

References

External links 

 
 Lampasas River at Texas Parks and Wildlife

Rivers of Texas
Brazos River
Rivers of Bell County, Texas
Rivers of Hamilton County, Texas
Rivers of Lampasas County, Texas
Rivers of Burnet County, Texas